This is a list of all cyclo-cross cyclists who competed at the 2017 UEC European Cyclo-cross Championships in Tábor, Czech Republic on 5 November 2017. There were for men and women an elite and under-23 race and a men's junior race.

Men's elite

Women's elite

Men's under-23

Women's under-23

Men's junior

References

UEC European Cyclo-cross Championships
Lists of cyclists